Histrionic personality disorder (HPD) is defined by the American Psychiatric Association as a personality disorder characterized by a pattern of excessive attention-seeking behaviors, usually beginning in early childhood, including inappropriate seduction and an excessive desire for approval. People diagnosed with the disorder are said to be lively, dramatic, vivacious, enthusiastic, extroverted and flirtatious.

HPD lies in the dramatic cluster of personality disorders. People with HPD have a high desire for attention, make loud and inappropriate appearances, exaggerate their behaviors and emotions, and crave stimulation. They may exhibit sexually provocative behavior, express strong emotions with an impressionistic style, and can be easily influenced by others. Associated features include egocentrism, self-indulgence, continuous longing for appreciation, and persistent manipulative behavior to achieve their own wants.

Signs and symptoms 
People diagnosed with HPD may be dramatic. They often fail to see their own personal situation realistically, instead dramatizing and exaggerating their difficulties. Patients with this disorder can have rapidly shifting emotions and a decreased ability to recognize other's emotions. Their emotions may appear superficial or exaggerated to others. This disorder is associated with extraversion, a lower tolerance for frustration or delayed gratification, and openness to new experiences. People with HPD may have little self-doubt and often appear egocentric.

Research has also shown those with histrionic personality have a greater desire for social approval and reassurance and will constantly seek it out, making those with HPD more vulnerable to social media addiction. People with this disorder often display excessive sensitivity to criticism or disapproval. They will work hard to get others to pay attention to them, possibly as a method of testing the stability of relationships. They may enjoy situations in which they can be the center of attention, and may feel uncomfortable when people are not paying attention to them. It is common for people with this disorder to wear flamboyant clothing, try body modifications, and fake medical conditions in an attempt to draw other's attention. They may display inappropriately sexually provocative, flirtatious, or exploitative behavior. Sexting and exhibitionist behavior are also behaviors people with this condition sometimes exhibit. Some people with histrionic traits or personality disorder change their seduction technique into a more maternal or paternal style as they age. When their desire for attention is not met, it can heighten the severity of their symptoms. They tend to be impressionable and easily manipulatable, especially by those they respect.

Patients with HPD are usually high-functioning, both socially and professionally. They usually have good social skills, despite tending to use them to make themselves the center of attention. HPD may also affect a person's social and romantic relationships, as well as their ability to cope with losses or failures. People with HPD tend to consider relationships closer than they usually are. They may seek treatment for clinical depression when romantic (or other close personal) relationships end. Substance disorders, such as alcohol use disorder or opioid use disorder, are all common in patients with histrionic personality disorder. They are also at higher risks of suicide, body dysmorphia, and divorce. They may go through frequent job changes, as they become easily bored and may prefer withdrawing from frustration (instead of facing it). Because they tend to crave novelty and excitement, they may place themselves in risky situations. All of these factors may lead to greater risk of developing clinical depression. People with this condition can have an impressionistic and undetailed style of speech.

Despite these traits, they can be prideful of their own personality, and may be unwilling to change, viewing any change as a threat. They may even blame their personal failures or disappointments on others.

Causes 
Little research has been done to find evidence of what causes histrionic personality disorder. Although direct causes are inconclusive, various theories and studies suggest multiple possible causes, of a neurochemical, genetic, psychoanalytic, or environmental nature. Traits such as extravagance, vanity, and seductiveness of hysteria have similar qualities to women diagnosed with HPD. HPD symptoms typically do not fully develop until the age of 15, while the onset of treatment only occurs, on average, at approximately 40 years of age.

Neurochemical/physiological 
Studies have shown that there is a strong correlation between the function of neurotransmitters and the Cluster B personality disorders such as HPD. Individuals diagnosed with HPD have a highly responsive noradrenergic system, which is responsible for the synthesis, storage, and release of the neurotransmitter norepinephrine. High levels of norepinephrine lead to anxiety-proneness, dependency, and high sociability.

Genetic 
Twin studies have aided in breaking down the genetic vs. environment debate. A twin study conducted by the Department of Psychology at Oslo University attempted to establish a correlation between genetics and Cluster B personality disorders. With a test sample of 221 twins, 92 monozygotic and 129 dizygotic, researchers interviewed the subjects using the Structured Clinical Interview for DSM-III-R Personality Disorders (SCID-II) and concluded that there was a correlation of 0.67 that histrionic personality disorder is hereditary.

Psychoanalytic theory 
Though criticised as being unsupported by scientific evidence, psychoanalytic theories incriminate authoritarian or distant attitudes by one (mainly the mother) or both parents, along with conditional love based on expectations the child can never fully meet. Using psychoanalysis, Freud believed that lustfulness was a projection of the patient's lack of ability to love unconditionally and develop cognitively to maturity, and that such patients were overall emotionally shallow. He believed the reason for being unable to love could have resulted from a traumatic experience, such as the death of a close relative during childhood or divorce of one's parents, which gave the wrong impression of committed relationships. Exposure to one or multiple traumatic occurrences of a close friend or family member's leaving (via abandonment or mortality) would make the person unable to form true and affectionate attachments towards other people.

HPD and antisocial personality disorder 
Another theory suggests a possible relationship between histrionic personality disorder and antisocial personality disorder. Research has found 2/3 of patients diagnosed with histrionic personality disorder also meet criteria similar to those of the antisocial personality disorder, which suggests both disorders based towards sex-type expressions may have the same underlying cause.

Some family history studies have found that histrionic personality disorder, as well as borderline and antisocial personality disorders, tend to run in families, but it is unclear how much is due to genetic versus environmental factors. Both examples suggest that predisposition could be a factor as to why certain people are diagnosed with histrionic personality disorder, however little is known about whether or not the disorder is influenced by any biological compound or is genetically inheritable. Little research has been conducted to determine the biological sources, if any, of this disorder.

Diagnosis 
The person's appearance, behavior and history, along with a psychological evaluation, are usually sufficient to establish a diagnosis. There is no test to confirm this diagnosis. Because the criteria are subjective, some people may be wrongly diagnosed.

DSM 5 
The current edition of the Diagnostic and Statistical Manual of Mental Disorders, DSM 5, defines histrionic personality disorder (in Cluster B) as:

The DSM 5 requires that a diagnosis for any specific personality disorder also satisfies a set of general personality disorder criteria.

ICD-10 
The World Health Organization's ICD-10 lists histrionic personality disorder (F60.4) as:

It is a requirement of ICD-10 that a diagnosis of any specific personality disorder also satisfies a set of general personality disorder criteria.

Comorbidity 
Most histrionics also have other mental disorders. Comorbid conditions include: antisocial, dependent, borderline, and narcissistic personality disorders, as well as depression, anxiety disorders, panic disorder, somatoform disorders, anorexia nervosa, substance use disorder and attachment disorders, including reactive attachment disorder.

Millon's subtypes 
In 2000, Theodore Millon suggested six subtypes of histrionic personality disorder. Any individual histrionic may exhibit one or more of the following:

Treatment 
Treatment is often prompted by depression associated with dissolved romantic relationships. Medication does little to affect the personality disorder, but may be helpful with symptoms such as depression. Treatment for HPD itself involves psychotherapy, including cognitive therapy.

Interviews and self-report methods 
In general clinical practice with assessment of personality disorders, one form of interview is the most popular: an unstructured interview. The actual preferred method is a semi-structured interview but there is reluctance to use this type of interview because they can seem impractical or superficial. The reason that a semi-structured interview is preferred over an unstructured interview is that semi-structured interviews tend to be more objective, systematic, replicable, and comprehensive. Unstructured interviews, despite their popularity, tend to have problems with unreliability and are susceptible to errors leading to false assumptions of the patient.

One of the single most successful methods for assessing personality disorders by researchers of normal personality functioning is the self-report inventory following up with a semi-structured interview. There are some disadvantages with the self-report inventory method that with histrionic personality disorder there is a distortion in character, self-presentation, and self-image. This cannot be assessed simply by asking most clients if they match the criteria for the disorder. Most projective testing depend less on the ability or willingness of the person to provide an accurate description of the self, but there is currently limited empirical evidence on projective testing to assess histrionic personality disorder.

Functional analytic psychotherapy 
Another way to treat histrionic personality disorder after identification is through functional analytic psychotherapy. The job of a Functional Analytic Psychotherapist is to identify the interpersonal problems with the patient as they happen in session or out of session. Initial goals of functional analytic psychotherapy are set by the therapist and include behaviors that fit the client's needs for improvement. Functional analytic psychotherapy differs from the traditional psychotherapy due to the fact that the therapist directly addresses the patterns of behavior as they occur in-session.

The in-session behaviors of the patient or client are considered to be examples of their patterns of poor interpersonal communication and to adjust their neurotic defenses. To do this, the therapist must act on the client's behavior as it happens in real time and give feedback on how the client's behavior is affecting their relationship during therapy. The therapist also helps the client with histrionic personality disorder by denoting behaviors that happen outside of treatment; these behaviors are termed "Outside Problems" and "Outside Improvements". This allows the therapist to assist in problems and improvements outside of session and to verbally support the client and condition optimal patterns of behavior". This then can reflect on how they are advancing in-session and outside of session by generalizing their behaviors over time for changes or improvement".

Coding client and therapist behaviors 
In these sessions there is a certain set of dialogue or script that can be forced by the therapist for the client to give insight on their behaviors and reasoning". Here is an example from" the conversation is hypothetical. T = therapist C = Client This coded dialogue can be transcribed as:

 ECRB – Evoking clinically relevant behavior
 T: Tell me how you feel coming in here today (CRB2) C: Well, to be honest, I was nervous. Sometimes I feel worried about how things will go, but I am really glad I am here.
 CRB1 – In-session problems
 C: Whatever, you always say that. (becomes quiet). I don't know what I am doing talking so much.
 CRB2 – In-session improvements
 TCRB1 – Clinically relevant response to client problems
 T: Now you seem to be withdrawing from me. That makes it hard for me to give you what you might need from me right now. What do you think you want from me as we are talking right now?".
 TCRB2 – Responses to client improvement
 T: That's great. I am glad you're here, too. I look forward to talking to you.

Functional ideographic assessment template 
Another example of treatment besides coding is functional ideographic assessment template. The functional ideographic assessment template, also known as FIAT, was used as a way to generalize the clinical processes of functional analytic psychotherapy. The template was made by a combined effort of therapists and can be used to represent the behaviors that are a focus for this treatment. Using the FIAT therapists can create a common language to get stable and accurate communication results through functional analytic psychotherapy at the ease of the client; as well as the therapist.

Epidemiology 
The survey data from the National epidemiological survey from 2001 to 2002 suggests a prevalence of HPD of 1.84 percent. Major character traits may be inherited, while other traits may be due to a combination of genetics and environment, including childhood experiences. This personality is seen more often in women than in men. Approximately 65% of HPD diagnoses are women while 35% are men. In Marcie Kaplan's A Women's View of DSM-III, she argues that women are overdiagnosed due to potential biases and expresses that even healthy women are often automatically diagnosed with HPD. It has also been argued due to diagnostic bias that prevalence rates are equal among women and men.

Many symptoms representing HPD in the DSM are exaggerations of traditional feminine behaviors. In a peer and self-review study, it showed that femininity was correlated with histrionic, dependent and narcissistic personality disorders. Although two thirds of HPD diagnoses are female, there have been a few exceptions. Whether or not the rate will be significantly higher than the rate of women within a particular clinical setting depends upon many factors that are mostly independent of the differential sex prevalence for HPD. Those with HPD are more likely to look for multiple people for attention, which leads to marital problems due to jealousy and lack of trust from the other party. This makes them more likely to become divorced or separated once married. With few studies done to find direct causations between HPD and culture, cultural and social aspects play a role in inhibiting and exhibiting HPD behaviors.

See also 
 Acting out

References

External links 

Cluster B personality disorders
Women and psychology
Medical mnemonics